Humphrey Smith (died 1663) was an English Quaker preacher.

Life
Smith probably lived in Little Cowarne, Herefordshire and preached in Andover, Hampshire. He was repeatedly arrested for preaching and wrote most of his books in Winchester gaol. He died of gaol fever (typhus).

Works
‘Something in Reply to Edmund Skipp's “The World's Wonder, or the Quaker's Blazing Star,” &c.’ London, 1655, 4to. Skipp was a preacher at Bodenham, Herefordshire. 
‘The Sufferings … of the Saints at Evesham’ [1656], 4to. 
‘An Alarum sounding forth,’ 1658, 4to. 
‘Divine Love spreading forth over all Nations,’ London, n.d., 4to. 
‘The True and Everlasting Rule,’ 1658, 4to. 
‘Hidden Things made manifest by the Light,’ 1658, 4to, reprinted 1664. 
‘To all Parents of Children,’ 1660 8vo; 2nd edit., 1667. 
‘For the Honour of the King,’ 1661, 4to. 
‘Sound Things asserted,’ 1662, 4to. 
‘Forty-four Queries propounded to all the Clergymen of the Liturgy, by One whom they trained up,’ 1662, 4to.

References

Year of birth missing
1663 deaths
17th-century Quakers
English Quakers
English people who died in prison custody
Quaker writers
17th-century English writers
17th-century English male writers
English religious writers
Deaths from typhus
People from Herefordshire